Alexander Vasilyevich Filipenko (born 31 May 1950) is a Russian politician, the former governor of Khanty-Mansi Autonomous Okrug.

References 

1950 births
Governors of Khanty-Mansi Autonomous Okrug
United Russia politicians
21st-century Russian politicians
People from Karaganda
Living people
Recipients of the Order "For Merit to the Fatherland", 2nd class
Recipients of the Order of Honour (Russia)
Communist Party of the Soviet Union members
Members of the Federation Council of Russia (1994–1996)
Members of the Federation Council of Russia (1996–2000)